was a Japanese swimmer who competed in the 1928 Summer Olympics in Amsterdam.

A graduate of Waseda University, Yoneyama was a member of the Japanese team which won the silver medal for the 4 × 200 meter freestyle relay event at the 1928 Amsterdam Olympics. He also placed fifth in the semifinal of the 400 meter freestyle event, and did not advance.

External links
Hiroshi Yoneyama Olympic medals and stats

1908 births
1988 deaths
Waseda University alumni
Olympic swimmers of Japan
Swimmers at the 1928 Summer Olympics
Olympic silver medalists for Japan
Sportspeople from Ibaraki Prefecture
Japanese male freestyle swimmers
Medalists at the 1928 Summer Olympics
Olympic silver medalists in swimming
20th-century Japanese people